Taraval and 19th Avenue is a light rail stop on the Muni Metro L Taraval line, located in the Parkside neighborhood of San Francisco, California. The stop opened with the first section of the L Taraval line on April 12, 1919.

Service 
Since August 2020, service along the route is temporarily being provided by buses to allow for the construction of improvements to the L Taraval line. The project is expected to wrap up in 2024.

Planned changes 

Like many stations on the line, 19th Avenue has no platforms; trains stop at marked poles before the cross street, and passengers cross travel lanes to board. In March 2014, Muni released details of the proposed implementation of their Transit Effectiveness Project (later rebranded MuniForward), which included a variety of stop changes for the L Taraval line. Boarding islands would be built between 19th Avenue and 18th Avenue.

On September 20, 2016, the SFMTA Board approved the L Taraval Rapid Project. Construction will occur from 2018 to 2020. Boarding islands with handicapped accessible platforms will be built; the inbound platform will remain west of 19th Avenue, with the outbound platform to the east. As an interim measure, painted clear zones were added in both directions in January 2017. The clear zones gave passengers a safe place to alight from trains before crossing the travel lane. Concrete platforms were added in early 2019.

References

External links 

SFMTA: Taraval St & 19th Ave inbound, outbound
SFBay Transit (unofficial): Taraval St & 19th Ave

Muni Metro stations
Railway stations in the United States opened in 1919